Astropecten duplicatus, the two-spined sea star, is a starfish in the family Astropectinidae. It is found in the eastern Atlantic Ocean, the Caribbean Sea and the Gulf of Mexico.

Description
Astropecten duplicatus normally has five long slender, tapering arms which are flattened dorso-ventrally. The aboral (upper) surface has a single row of large marginal plates around the edges of the arms. These are granular, and the two that are closest to the disc each bear a conical spine, although this is often worn away. Other marginal plates and the plates on the oral (lower) surface bear many fine blunt spinules. The tube feet are pointed and have no suckers. The aboral surface is pale grey or reddish-brown and the oral surface is pale brown or orange.

Distribution and habitat
Astropecten duplicatus is native to the eastern Atlantic Ocean, the Caribbean Sea and the Gulf of Mexico. Its range extends from Cape Hatteras, Florida, Cuba and the Bahamas to Mexico, Colombia, Venezuela and Guyana.

Biology
Astropecten duplicatus spends the day semi-immersed in the sediment on the seabed. It is a carnivore and at night it hunts for bivalve molluscs and gastropods. It transfers its prey to its mouth with its arms, and swallows it whole, later regurgitating any undigested fragments.

References

External links
 

Astropecten
Animals described in 1840
Taxa named by John Edward Gray